The Douglas & Nancy Barnhart Cancer Center at Sharp Chula Vista Medical Center is a comprehensive cancer treatment center in Chula Vista, California, in the United States. The Barnhart Cancer Center at Sharp Chula Vista is part of Sharp HealthCare, in San Diego, California. The Barnhart Cancer Center features a full range of cancer services from diagnosis to treatment and recovery.

Services

 Breast Cancer Patient Navigator Program
 Chemotherapy
 High-dose-rate brachytherapy
 Image-guided radiotherapy
 Infusion therapy
 Integrative and complementary therapies including Healing Touch and aromatherapy
 Intensity-modulated radiation therapy
 Medical oncology and hematology
 Prevention and early detection, including diagnostic and women's imaging
 Radiation therapy
 Social services
 Stereotactic radiosurgery
 Support services including pet therapy, support groups, nutrition counseling, “Meet the Pathologist” sessions and Look Good, Feel Better programs
 TrueBeam STx radiotherapy/radiosurgery

External links
 Official Sharp HealthCare website

Cancer organizations based in the United States
Chula Vista, California
Hospitals in San Diego County, California
Organizations based in San Diego County, California